The sentence "Rose is a rose is a rose is a rose" was written by Gertrude Stein as part of the 1913 poem "Sacred Emily", which appeared in the 1922 book Geography and Plays. In that poem, the first "Rose" is the name of a person. Stein later used variations on the sentence in other writings, and the shortened form "A rose is a rose is a rose" is among her most famous quotations, often interpreted as meaning "things are what they are", a statement of the law of identity, "A is A". In Stein's view, the sentence expresses the fact that simply using the name of a thing already invokes the imagery and emotions associated with it, an idea also intensively discussed in the problem of universals debate where Peter Abelard and others used the rose as an example concept. As the quotation diffused through her own writing, and the culture at large, Stein once remarked, "Now listen! I'm no fool. I know that in daily life we don't go around saying 'is a ... is a ... is a ...' Yes, I'm no fool; but I think that in that line the rose is red for the first time in English poetry for a hundred years." (Four in America).

She said to an audience at Oxford University that the statement referred to the fact that when the Romantics used the word "rose", it had a direct relationship to an actual rose. For later periods in literature this would no longer be true. The eras following Romanticism, notably the modern era, use the word rose to refer to the actual rose, yet they also imply, through the use of the word, the archetypical elements of the romantic era.

Mentions of "rose" in "Sacred Emily"
The following lines appear at widely separated places in "Sacred Emily":
 It is rose in hen.
 Jack Rose Jack Rose.
 Rose is a rose is a rose is a rose.

Versions by Gertrude Stein 
"Rose is a rose is a rose is a rose." ("Sacred Emily", Geography and Plays)
"Do we suppose that all she knows is that a rose is a rose is a rose is a rose." (Operas and Plays)
"... she would carve on the tree Rose is a Rose is a Rose is a Rose is a Rose until it went all the way around." (The World is Round)
"A rose tree may be a rose tree may be a rosy rose tree if watered." (Alphabets and Birthdays)
"Indeed a rose is a rose makes a pretty plate...." (Stanzas in Meditation)
"When I said.
A rose is a rose is a rose is a rose.
And then later made that into a ring I made poetry and what did I do I caressed completely caressed and addressed a noun."  (Lectures in America)
"Civilization begins with a rose.  A rose is a rose is a rose is a rose. It continues with blooming and it fastens clearly upon excellent examples."  (As Fine as Melanctha)
"Lifting belly can please me because it is an occupation I enjoy.
Rose is a rose is a rose is a rose.
In print on top." (Bee Time Vine)

Variations by others 
 "A rose is a rose is a rose" and its variants have been contrasted with Shakespeare's "A rose by any other name would smell as sweet".
 The sentence was heavily promoted by Stein's life partner Alice B. Toklas; for example, she sold plates with the sentence going all the way around.
 It is told that Picasso answered to somebody asking the meaning of his paintings: "Go in the garden and ask the rose its meaning."
 Robert Frost alludes to Stein's sentence in his poem "The Rose Family", from the 1929 collection West-Running Brook.
 "Evidente y secreto, como el diamante, como el agua, como el desnudo, como la rosa" (Juan Ramón Jiménez, Madrid: Sánchez Cuesta, 1929)
 The sentence was parodied by Ernest Hemingway after a brief time in Paris seeking editorial suggestions for his writing: "a stone is a stein is a rock is a boulder is a pebble." This also appears in his 1940 novel For Whom the Bell Tolls, in which there is yet another parody: "a rose is a rose is an onion." After a (perhaps bitter) falling out, the sentence becomes, "a bitch is a bitch is a bitch is a bitch."
 The sentence appears in the 1952 musical film Singin' in the Rain, in the musical number "Moses Supposes". While parodying a dialogue coach, the characters of Don Lockwood and Cosmo Brown sing: "...A Rose is a rose is a rose is a rose is / A rose is what Moses supposes his toes is / Couldn't be a lily or a taffy daphi dilli / It's gotta be a rose cuz it rhymes with mose!"
 The sentence appears in the 1952 Charlie Chaplin film  Limelight. Chaplin's character expresses it as "The meaning of anything is merely other words for the same thing. After all, a rose is a rose is a rose. That's not bad. It should be quoted."
 Aldous Huxley paraphrases the quotation in his 1954 book The Doors of Perception, writing "A rose is a rose is a rose. But these chair legs were chair legs were St. Michael and all angels."  In his 1958 book, Brave New World Revisited, Huxley also referenced the quotation, writing, "An apple is an apple is an apple, whereas the moon is the moon is the moon."
 William Carlos Williams in a poem "The Pink Locust", appearing in his 1955 collection Journey to Love, quotes "a rose is a rose/ is a rose" as emblematic of the poet's self-deprecation in relation to life. Williams regards the phrase as a slogan of poetic tautology, denying the value of the creative act: the poet feels impotent and recognizes in her art merely a banal repetition of the words we use every day to represent the unrepresentable richness of the natural world. But the following lines of the poem offer an alternative view, one which Williams re-affirmed throughout his career: "A rose is a rose/ and the poem equals it/ if it be well made."
 In the 1960 Broadway musical Bye Bye Birdie (and its 1963 film adaptation), the character of Albert Peterson refers to the saying in the song "Rosie", in which he sings, "Oh, I once heard a poem that goes / A rose is a rose is a rose / But I don't agree / Take it from me / There's one rose sweeter than any that grows!"
 In 1968, the Portuguese artist João Vieira (1934–2009) painted the oil on canvas Uma Rosa É [A Rose Is], a work later (1971) reproduced on the cover of Colóquio Artes, # 1, a prestigious cultural magazine issued by Fundação Calouste Gulbenkian, Lisbon.
 In 1973 avant rock band Henry Cow sings "But a rose is a rose is a rose" on "Nine Funerals of the Citizen King".
 UK Prime Minister Margaret Thatcher said in 1981 that "A crime is a crime is a crime" in reference to the actions of members of the IRA. The sentence has been used by other speakers as well, with the intended meaning of "no matter what you call it, criminal violence is criminal, and illegal."
 In the 1978 film The Magic of Lassie, Robert and Richard Sherman penned the song, "A Rose Is Not a Rose".
 "A Rose Is Not A Rose" is a song written by Richard M. Sherman and Robert B. Sherman for the 1978 motion picture musical The Magic of Lassie and performed by Pat Boone.
 Irving Stettner in his poem Singing: "A rose is a rose/ is a rose", as Gertrude/ Stein once said,/ and when i sing/ yes, i'm a red rose/ like anything!"
 "Una rosa es una rosa es una rosa", the Spanish translation of Stein's verse, is the chorus of a song by the Spanish pop music group Mecano that appeared on their 1991 album, Aidalai.  The pop-flamenco song tells the story of a man in love with a woman who by turns hurts and soothes him.
 Bret Easton Ellis sent up the sentence in his 1991 novel American Psycho, as narrator Patrick Bateman utters, "a Rolls is a Rolls is a Rolls" during one of his frequent materialist stream-of-consciousness tirades.
 A Rose Is Still a Rose was the title of a 1998 album by soul singer Aretha Franklin and a song from the album by Franklin and Lauryn Hill. The song, written by Hill, also contains the refrain, "What I am is what I am."
 In the liner notes to the 1999 The Magnetic Fields album 69 Love Songs, frontman Stephin Merritt credited the sentence as an inspiration for the songs "The Things We Did and Didn't Do" and "The Flowers She Sent and the Flowers She Said She Sent".
 Idlewild, a Scottish rock band, wrote a song called "Roseability", which appeared on their 2000 album 100 Broken Windows. The song mentions Stein at the end of the chorus—"and Gertrude Stein said that's enough"—and features large portraits of Stein in the background of the music video.
 The sentence is quoted by David Lodge in his 2001 novel, Thinks ..., in the context of a debate between the fictional characters of Arthur Messenger (a cognitive scientist) and Helen Reed (a novelist).
 James Tenney made a skillful if short setting of "Rose is a rose is a rose is a rose" as a canon dedicated to Philip Corner, beginning with an "a" on an upbeat rhythm and continuing so that each repetition shuffles the words, e.g. "a/rose is a rose/is a rose is/a rose is a/rose." 
 Mordecai Richler in his novel Barney's Version ridicules the stupidity of court speeches when the prosecutor ends his opening speech with "murder is murder is murder."
 Jeanette Winterson wrote in her novel Written on the Body: "Sometimes a breast is a breast is a breast."
 "La rosa es una rosa es una rosa" is used in Fernando del Paso's Sonetos con lugares comunes.
 A song by Poe (Anne Danielewski), "A rose is a rose", states "a rose is a rose is a rose is a rose said my good friend Gertrude Stein."
 The computer game Carmen Sandiego features a villain humorously named Rosa Zarrosas-Arroz.
 Jeff Smith in the issue 13 of the Bone series, Fone Bone's love poems begin with "a rose is a rose is a rose".
 William Burroughs wrote a linguistic variant: "the word for word is word."
 The Italian rock band Long Hair in Three Stages use the variant "Rain is rain is rain is..." in a song called "Nothing" and then the original version by Stein, "A rose is a rose is a rose..." in a song called "Rose".
 In the late-1980s, an American public service announcement featured a message regarding identical alcohol content in three alcoholic drinks—a beer, a mixed drink, and a shot of whiskey—with the sentence "A drink is a drink is a drink."
 In the "Misleader" seventeenth episode of the first season of Law & Order: Special Victims Unit, the character Detective Munch says, "a rape is a rape is a rape", implying that the bizarre nature of the rape he was investigating did not change the fact that a rape had occurred and that rape is still illegal.
 In the English radio series My Word!, Frank Muir was called on to explain the origin of the sentence. His explanation: Nero and Cicero had rose gardens next to each other. The tender of Nero's garden had a mishap and destroyed a whole row of roses. So he sneaked over to Cicero's garden, stole a row from there and replaced the ones missing in his master's garden. However, they were white, while the ones in Nero's garden were pink or "rose-colored". When Nero saw this he wrote a note to the gardener: "Our roses are rose. Is a row Cicero's?" He has also rendered it as "Arrows sees Harrow's Ciceros" in a spin-off book You Can't Have Your Kayak and Heat It.
 Julio Cortázar wrote in his novel Rayuela "A es A, a rose is a rose is a rose, April is the cruellest month, cada cosa en su lugar y un lugar para cada rosa es una rosa es una rosa..."
 Stephen King refers to "A rose is a rose is a rose..." in his popular fantasy series The Dark Tower.
 Helge Schneider shortens this sentence in German (title: "Eine Rose ist eine Rose ist", Album: 29 sehr sehr gute Erzählungen)
 South African bank Nedbank advertises with the slogan "A bank isn't a bank isn't a bank."
Jonathan Safran Foer uses an altercation of the line "A rose is not a rose is not a rose!" and “A bullet’s a bullet’s a bullet!” in his 2003 book Extremely Loud & Incredibly Close.
 In the 2005 House M.D. episode "Three Stories", Dr. House gives a lecture on diagnosing leg pain, and states that "Leg is a leg is a leg", whoever the patient.
 Massachusetts hardcore-punk act Bane uses the motif,  "a lie is a lie is a lie is a lie" in "Her Lucky Pretty Eyes", from their 1999 record It All Comes Down to This.
 Georg Friedrich alias "Schorsch" says in Michael Glawogger's 2009 film Contact High as he drives backwards because of seeing a Polish police car that "Bulln san Bulln san Bulln", which means that "Cops are cops are cops".
 In the 2010 movie Scott Pilgrim vs. the World, Stephen Stills says: "A gig is a gig is a gig is a gig."
 Philip Jose Farmer had his character Omar Runic say "That a rose is a rose is a" in an extemporaneous poem he recites in the 1967 novella Riders of the Purple Wage.
 In the 1968 film Where Eagles Dare Major Smith, played by Richard Burton, says "... but what the hell, a hole is a hole is a hole, as they say".
 Vinícius de Moraes, at "Rancho das Flores": "Que uma rosa não é só uma flor Uma rosa é uma rosa,  é uma rosa É a mulher rescendendo de amor". (A rose is not only a flower, a rose is a rose, and a rose is a woman exhaling of love.—not precise translation)
 In Tales of Symphonia: Dawn of the New World, Marta Lualdi says "A thief is a thief is a thief!".
 In the 2011 Supernatural episode "The Man Who Would Be King", the character Crowley laments "a whore is a whore is a whore" to Castiel.
 In the novel Double Feature: Attack of the Soul-Sucking Brain Zombies/Bride of the Soul-Sucking Brain Zombies by Brent Hartinger, Russel says: "Zombie guts are zombie guts are zombie guts" to Min and Gunnar.
 In Guardians of the Galaxy Vol. 3 Issue 8, Peter Quill says "a save is a save is a... save." to Abigail Brand when they are unexpectedly saved by Angela during their brief captivity at the Peak.
 In Laura Lemay's book Teach Yourself Java in 21 Days, the difference between upper and lowercase variable names is illustrated by, "A 'rose' is not a 'Rose' is not a 'ROSE'."
 Richard Dennis wrote in "The Whizkid of Futures Trading" (Business Week, December 6, 1982, p. 102): "'A trend is a trend is a trend', Gertrude Stein would have said if she were a trader...".
 Canadian Prime Minister Justin Trudeau has stated, "A Canadian is a Canadian is a Canadian."
 Former Canadian Prime Minister Jean Chretien said, "A proof is a proof is a proof."
 In the 2016 Blindspot episode "Cease Forcing Enemy", Ashley Johnson as Patterson talks Jaimie Alexander in landing a plane saying "A plane, is a plane, is a plane".
 In Tell Me Three Things by Julie Buxbaum the main character thinks "Ethan is Ethan is Ethan," an nth number of times.
 The title of Reto Geiser's book about Architectures and Collaborations of Johnston Marklee is House is a house is a house is a house is a house.
 In his 2016 Tony Award acceptance speech for his musical Hamilton, Lin-Manuel Miranda stated "love is love is love is love is love is love is love is love" in reference to the Orlando shooting at a gay club the night before.
 In the pilot episode of the HBO series Westworld (2016) the android character Peter Abernathy (Louis Herthum) utters the phrase to Ford (Anthony Hopkins) after malfunctioning.
 In "Body Parts" (Star Trek: Deep Space Nine), the Rule of Acquisition No. 17: "A contract is a contract is a contract (but only between Ferengi)."
 In Rupi Kaur's The Sun and Her Flowers: "a friend or a lover a loss is a loss is a loss"
 Visual artist Roni Horn, in th rose prblm (2017), refers to the subject.
Abstract artist, Shane Guffogg, created a series partly inspired by this phrase titled, A Rose is a Rose is a Rose, in 2019 using oils on canvas.
In the 1977 episode of M*A*S*H, "Margaret's Marriage", Hawkeye says "An affair is an affair is an affair".
In the 2018 Ozark episode "Once a Langmore...", Jason Butler Harner as Agent Patty responds to Rachel's (Jordana Spiro) comment regarding his clumsy placing of the wire in her bra by saying, "A breast is a breast is a breast."
In the English edition of his book Discourse Networks 1800 / 1900, Friedrich Kittler  paraphrases Stein's formula: "A medium is a medium is a medium." (p. 229, p. 265)
Bruno Munari's landmark design work Design as Art (1966) contains a section titled A Rose is a Rose is a, which begins with: "And then you go up to it and see, for the sake of argument, that it is an artificial rose. Then you become aware of the material it is made of... But at first glance you were certain of one thing only, that it was a rose."

See also
 Alliteration
 Law of identity
 Proof by assertion
 Rhetorical device
 Rule of three (writing)

References

External links
 Text of "Sacred Emily"

Quotations from literature
American poetry
Identity (philosophy)
Rhetorical techniques
Gertrude Stein
1910s neologisms